The Spanish International or Spanish Open is an international badminton tournament held annually in Madrid since 1974, and is hosted by the Spanish Badminton Federation (FESBA).

Winners

Successful players
Below is the list of the most ever successful players in Spanish International Badminton Tournament:

Performances by nation

References

External links
 Federación Española de Bádminton PDF

Badminton tournaments in Spain
Sports competitions in Madrid
Recurring sporting events established in 1974
1974 establishments in Spain